Lednice is a municipality and village in Břeclav District in the South Moravian Region of the Czech Republic. It has about 2,100 inhabitants. It is known as part of Lednice–Valtice Cultural Landscape, a UNESCO World Heritage Site.

Administrative parts
The village of Nejdek is an administrative part of Lednice.

History
The first written mention of Lednice is from 1222 under its Latin name Izgruobi, as a property of the Sirotek family. In the mid-13th century it was passed into the hands of the House of Liechtenstein and its fortunes had been tied inseparably to the members of this noble family.

Demographics

Sights
In 1996 the Lednice–Valtice Cultural Landscape was inscribed on the UNESCO World Heritage List as "an exceptional example of the designed landscape that evolved in the Enlightenment and afterwards under the care of a single family."

The palace of Lednice was originally a Renaissance villa. In the 17th century it became a summer residence of the ruling Princes of Liechtenstein. The estate house, designed and furbished by baroque architects Johann Bernhard Fischer von Erlach, Domenico Martinelli, and Anton Johan Ospel, proclaimed rural luxury on the grandest scale. In 1846–58 it was extensively rebuilt in the neo-Gothic style under the supervision of Georg Wingelmüller.

Economy
Lednice lies in the Mikulovská wine subregion and is known for its wine production.

Notable people
Johann II, Prince of Liechtenstein (1840–1929), monarch

References

External links

World Heritage Site

World Heritage Sites in the Czech Republic
Gothic Revival architecture in the Czech Republic
Palaces in the Czech Republic
House of Liechtenstein
Populated places in Břeclav District
Cities and towns in the Czech Republic
Territorial disputes of Czechoslovakia